This is a list of Maltese football transfers for the 2009–10 winter transfer window by club. Only transfers of clubs in the Maltese Premier League and Maltese First Division are included.

The summer transfer window opened on 1 January 2010, although a few transfers may take place prior to that date. The window closed at midnight on 31 January 2010. Players without a club may join one at any time, either during or in between transfer windows.

Maltese Premier League

Birkirkara

In:

 

Out:

Dingli Swallows

In:

Out:

Floriana

In:

 
 

 

Out:

Ħamrun Spartans

In:

 

Out:

Hibernians

In:

Out:

Msida Saint-Joseph

In:

 
 

Out:

Qormi

In:

 

Out:

Sliema Wanderers

In:

Out:

Tarxien Rainbows

In:

 

Out:

Valletta

In:

 

Out:

Maltese First Division

Balzan Youths

In:

Out:

Marsaxlokk

In:

Out:

Melita

In:

Out:

Mosta

In:

 

Out:

Mqabba

In:

Out:

Pietà Hotspurs

In:

Out:

San Gwann

In:

Out:

St. George's

In:

Out:

St. Patrick

In:

Out:

Vittoriosa Stars

In:

Out:

Manager Transfers

See also
 List of Belgian football transfers winter 2009–10
 List of Danish football transfers winter 2009–10
 List of English football transfers winter 2009–10
 List of French football transfers winter 2010
 List of German football transfers winter 2009–10
 List of Hungarian football transfers winter 2009–2010
 List of Italian football transfers winter 2009–10
 List of Spanish football transfers winter 2009–10
 List of Swedish football transfers winter 2009–2010

References

External links
 Official Website

Maltese
Transfers
Maltese
2009–10